The Newport Beach Surf were a minor league basketball team that played in the former West Coast Pro Basketball League. They were based in the American Sports Center located in Anaheim, California.

Final roster
 Kirk Turner Head Coach
 Doug Cherry Assistant Coach
 Rick Darnell Assistant Coach
 Norm Nixon Team Consultant 
 Marcel Jackson
 James Renyolds
 Jushay Rockett
 Tez Banks
 Mike Martin
 Terrell Hendricks
 Vince Camper
 Jean Regis
 Kyle Brucculeri
 Jason Harris

References

External links
 Official Team Website
 League

Basketball teams in Anaheim, California
Basketball teams established in 2008
2008 establishments in California
2013 disestablishments in California
Basketball teams disestablished in 2013